"I Should Have Known Better" is a song by Jim Diamond, released in 1984 as the lead single from his debut solo album Double Crossed (1985). It was a UK number one single for one week in December 1984. The song was displaced after one week by Frankie Goes to Hollywood's song "The Power of Love". Diamond publicly requested that people not buy his single, but instead buy the charity single "Do They Know It's Christmas?" by Band Aid.

"I Should Have Known Better" was re-recorded for Diamond's 1993 solo album Jim Diamond. He  recorded the song a third time for his 2005 single "Blue Shoes", which also featured a re-recording of "I Won't Let You Down" and covers of old soul songs such as "My Girl".

Charts

Weekly charts

Year-end charts

Cover versions
The song was covered in French by Julie Pietri ("À force de toi"). It was also covered in Italian by Matteo Becucci ("Lo avrei dovuto sapere"), as part of a compilation that showcased the contestants of the second season of The X-Factor Italia. A Spanish version of the song, "Te Veo Pasar" was recorded by Yolandita Monge for her album Luz de Luna.

References

1984 songs
1984 singles
Jim Diamond (singer) songs
Number-one singles in Australia
Number-one singles in Portugal
Irish Singles Chart number-one singles
UK Singles Chart number-one singles
Songs written by Graham Lyle
Songs written by Jim Diamond (singer)
Song recordings produced by Pip Williams
Rock ballads
A&M Records singles